The Historic Albemarle Tour or Historic Albemarle Highway is a tour route located in northeastern North Carolina. The tour follows several U.S. and State highways in the seventeen county region, identifying historic sites and towns, marked with brown signs with the George Monck, 1st Duke of Albemarle coat of arms.

Route description

The tour route is not a linear route, like most scenic routes, but a collection of several highways in the region.  The following list are the component
highways that make-up the tour route:

Sites
Aurora Fossil Museum
Bath, the oldest continuously inhabited town in North Carolina
Belhaven Memorial Museum, currently housed in Belhaven City Hall, in the town of Belhaven
Camden County Welcome Center, located on the Dismal Swamp Canal
Chicamacomico Life-Saving Station located in Rodanthe
Columbia
Corolla, location of the Currituck Beach Light
Edenton, former colonial capital of the Province of North Carolina
Elizabeth City
Frisco Native American Museum in Frisco, North Carolina
Graveyard of the Atlantic Museum in Hatteras Village
Halifax, location of the Fourth Provincial Congress, which authorized the Halifax Resolves
Hertford
Hope Plantation, a restored antebellum plantation house near Windsor
Jackson
Museum of the Albemarle
North Carolina Aquariums with locations in Manteo, Fort Fisher, and Pine Knoll Shores
Ocracoke
Plymouth
Roanoke Island Festival Park in Manteo
Somerset Place, a restored antebellum plantation house  near Creswell
Tarboro
Williamston
Windsor

History
The tour route was established in 1975 by the North Carolina General Assembly, which included designated highways, locations and signage.  A 1977 act amended the original law to expand the list of designated highways and locations.

References

External links
 Historic Albemarle Tour

 
1975 establishments in North Carolina
Transport infrastructure completed in 1975
Scenic highways in the United States
Historic trails and roads in North Carolina
U.S. Route 13
U.S. Route 17
U.S. Route 64
U.S. Route 301
George Monck, 1st Duke of Albemarle